Che or cheem, is a letter of the Persian alphabet, used to represent , and which derives from  by the addition of two dots. It is found with this value in other Arabic-derived scripts. It is used in Persian, Urdu, Pashto, Kurdish, Kashmiri, Azerbaijani, Ottoman Turkish, Malay (Jawi), Java (Pegon), and other Iranian languages. Modern Standard Arabic lacks this letter.

In Arabic

The letter  can be used to transcribe  of Persian Gulf: Gulf Arabic and Iraqi Arabic, where they have that sound natively. (In the case of Moroccan Arabic, the letter  is used instead to transliterate the Spanish  sound; this letter derives from šīn with an additional three dots below.)

The  pronunciation is also proposed for South Arabian minority languages, like Mehri and Soqotri.

Character encodings

See also
ڤ - Ve (Arabic)
پ - Pe (Persian)
گ - Gaf (Persian)
ژ - Že (Arabic)

References

Persian letters
Arabic script